Ophélia Kolb (born 1982) is a French actress.

Filmography

Cinema 
 Pink Room (2004) … The Girl
 Valériane va en ville (2006) … Valériane
 Those Who Remain (2007) … Jennifer
 Dans leur peau (2007)
 Gainsbourg (Vie héroïque) (2010) … The Model
 L'Autre Dumas (2010) … Marion
 Les Cybernautes rêvent-ils d'amours digitales ? (2011) … Mélanie
 Lilith (2011) … Rachel
 Gare du Nord (2013)
 La Vache (2016) … Stéphanie
 Amanda (2018) … Sandrine

Television 
 Chez Maupassant, "Histoire d'une fille de ferme" (2007) … Margot
 Ce jour là, tout a changé, "L'évasion de Louis XVI" (2009) … Lucile Desmoulins
 Profilage (2009) … Noémie Bertrand
 Caméra Café 2 (2010) … Anne-Sophie Le Troarec
 La Commanderie (2010) … Aygline
 Boulevard du Palais (2010) … Fleur
 The law of Barbara (2014) … Sarah Mayet
 Call My Agent ! (2015) … Colette Brancillon (18 Episodes)
 "18h30" (saison 2 2022)... La réalisatrice

Theatre 
2012-2013: The Seagull
2016 : La Médiation

External links 

Living people
French film actresses
French television actresses
French stage actresses
21st-century French actresses
1982 births